The 1984 United States presidential election in Iowa took place on November 6, 1984. All 50 states and the District of Columbia, were part of the 1984 United States presidential election. Voters chose eight electors to the Electoral College, which selected the president and vice president of the United States.

Iowa was won by incumbent United States President Ronald Reagan of California, who was running against former Vice President Walter Mondale of Minnesota. Reagan ran for a second time with former C.I.A. Director George H. W. Bush of Texas, and Mondale ran with Representative Geraldine Ferraro of New York, the first major female candidate for the vice presidency.

The presidential election of 1984 was a very partisan election for Iowa, with over 99 percent of the electorate voting only for either the Democratic or Republican parties, though several parties appeared on the ballot. While the majority of counties turned out for Reagan, the politically volatile state of Iowa was a relatively narrow victory for him, thanks in part to the Midwest Farm Crisis of the early 1980s. The relatively weak Republican trend for this election is highlighted with the loss of Des Moines's highly populated Polk County to Mondale.

Iowa weighed in for this election as 11 points more Democratic than the national average. , this is the last election in which Scott County, Black Hawk County, Linn County, and Story County voted for a Republican presidential candidate.

Reagan won the election in Iowa by a 7.4% margin. While a sound victory, this made Iowa 10.8% more Democratic than the nation, a signal of Iowa's increasingly liberal bent over the second half of the Cold War period. Of the four Republican landslides during the Cold War (1952, 1956, 1972, and 1984), this one featured the weakest Republican win in Iowa. Iowa had been a double-digit win for Republicans in the nationally close elections of 1960 and 1968, but in 1976 had gone for Ford by just a little over 1%. In 1980, Reagan won Iowa by a somewhat larger margin than he won the nation by, but by margin, his support in Iowa receded in 1984, as the long-time bellwether county of Palo Alto, which had last voted for a loser in 1892, switched to Mondale. Four years later, Iowa would back Dukakis, making George H. W. Bush the first Republican to win the White House without carrying the Hawkeye State since the party's founding and representing the consolidation of a short-lived new Democratic base in the Upper Midwest. By 2000, when Gore carried Iowa by less than 1%, cracks in this new base were already evident; Iowa would go on to vote narrowly for George W. Bush in 2004 and by decisive margins for Donald Trump in 2016 and 2020.

Democratic platform

Walter Mondale accepted the Democratic nomination for presidency after pulling narrowly ahead of Senator Gary Hart of Colorado and Rev. Jesse Jackson of Illinois - his main contenders during what would be a very contentious Democratic primary. During the campaign, Mondale was vocal about reduction of government spending, and, in particular, was vocal against heightened military spending on the nuclear arms race against the Soviet Union, which was reaching its peak on both sides in the early 1980s.

Taking a (what was becoming the traditional liberal) stance on the social issues of the day, Mondale advocated for gun control, the right to choose regarding abortion, and strongly opposed the repeal of laws regarding institutionalized prayer in public schools. He also criticized Reagan for his economic marginalization of the poor, stating that Reagan's reelection campaign was "a happy talk campaign," not focused on the real issues at hand.

A very significant political move during this election: the Democratic Party nominated Representative Geraldine Ferraro to run with Mondale as Vice-President. Ferraro is the first female candidate to receive such a nomination in United States history. She said in an interview at the 1984 Democratic National Convention that this action "opened a door which will never be closed again," speaking to the role of women in politics.

Republican platform
By 1984, Reagan was very popular with voters across the nation as the President who saw them out of the economic stagflation of the early and middle 1970s, and into a period of (relative) economic stability.

The economic success seen under Reagan was politically accomplished (principally) in two ways. The first was initiation of deep tax cuts for the wealthy, and the second was a wide-spectrum of tax cuts for crude oil production and refinement, namely, with the 1980 Windfall profits tax cuts. These policies were augmented with a call for heightened military spending, the cutting of social welfare programs for the poor, and the increasing of taxes on those making less than $50,000 per year. Collectively called "Reaganomics", these economic policies were established through several pieces of legislation passed between 1980 and 1987.

These new tax policies also arguably curbed several existing tax loopholes, preferences, and exceptions, but Reaganomics is typically remembered for its trickle down effect of taxing poor Americans more than rich ones. Reaganomics has (along with legislation passed under presidents George H. W. Bush and Bill Clinton) been criticized by many analysts as "setting the stage" for economic troubles in the United States after 2007, such as the Great Recession.

Virtually unopposed during the Republican primaries, Reagan ran on a campaign of furthering his economic policies. Reagan vowed to continue his "war on drugs," passing sweeping legislation after the 1984 election in support of mandatory minimum sentences for drug possession.  Furthermore, taking a (what was becoming the traditional conservative) stance on the social issues of the day, Reagan strongly opposed legislation regarding comprehension of gay marriage, abortion, and (to a lesser extent) environmentalism, regarding the final as simply being bad for business.

Results

Results by county

See also
 United States presidential elections in Iowa
 Presidency of Ronald Reagan

References

Iowa
1984
1984 Iowa elections